p53-regulated apoptosis-inducing protein 1 is a protein that in humans is encoded by the TP53AIP1 gene.

References

Further reading